The Mystic Warrior is a 1984 American TV movie about a band of Sioux and the efforts of one man to save his people from destruction through the use of mysterious powers handed down by ancestors. The movie was originally a nine-hour mini-series entitled Hanta Yo to be aired in 1980, instead aired in 1984 as a five-hour mini-series with the new name. The mini-series has been released on DVD in Germany, but no international release as yet.

Plot
Set in the years 1802 to 1808, the finished film focused on a young brave named Ahbleza, the son of Olepi, chief of a fictional lakota-speaking tribe, the Mahto ('Bear'). Blessed with supernatural visionary powers by the ancient Mahto seer Wanagi, Ahbleza sets about to save his people from the devastations of the future, among them the invasion of the white man. After a lengthy, truth-seeking odyssey fraught with tragedy and sacrifice, Ahbleza assumes his rightful place as spiritual leader of his tribe.

Cast
 Robert Beltran - Ahbleza
Devon Ericson - Heyatawin
 David Yanez   - Rion Hunter - Tonweya
Brigitte Gault - Kippana 
Victoria Racimo - Napewaste
Nick Ramus - Chief Olepi
 James Remar - Pesla
Ned Romero - Wisa
 Apollonia Kotero - Wicahpi
Branscombe Richmond - Miyaca
 Will Sampson - Wambli
 Doug Toby - Young Ahbleza
 George Aguilar - Kungi Yuha Leader
 Ivan Naranjo - Ogle 
 Frank Salsedo - Sinte (as Frank Sotonoma Salsedo)

Production
The five-hour miniseries The Mystic Warrior began life in 1979 when producer David L. Wolper announced plans for a ten-hour adaptation of Hanta Yo, an epic historical novel by Ruth Beebe Hill. Using as her main source a full-blooded Sioux named Chunksa Yuha, Hill fashioned what amounted to a Native American version of Roots, chronicling the history of the fictional Matho (lakota: 'Bear') tribe of the Oglala Lakota Sioux. Although Hill was briefly the darling of the literary cognoscenti, her book was ultimately attacked and discredited by a veritable army of Indian historians, teachers, and activists, who accused her of distorting and falsifying truths in order to promote her own (and Yuha's) sociopolitical agenda. Suddenly, all of the Native American support that had been promised to the miniseries version of Hanta Yo evaporated. When the project finally aired on May 20 through 21, 1984, its running time (and budget) had been cut in half, and the producer was obliged to qualify the credits by noting that the teleplay was based partially on Hill's book, but mostly on "other sources". 
The filming location had to be changed from New Mexico to Thousand Oaks, California, so as not to offend the Indian tribes in the former state.

References

https://www.imdb.com/name/nm0945946/  David Yanez

External links

American television films
1984 television films
1984 films
ABC network original films
The Wolper Organization films
Films about Native Americans
Films directed by Richard T. Heffron